MS 1970 is the ski jumping venue in Štrbské Pleso, Slovakia. The MS 1970 A is a K-125 and the MS 1970 B is a K-90. The K-90 has plastic mattings and is often used.

References

Ski jumping venues in Slovakia
Sport in Prešov Region